The Mifflintown Formation is a geologic formation in Maryland. It preserves fossils dating back to the Silurian period.

See also
 List of fossiliferous stratigraphic units in Maryland
 Paleontology in Maryland

References

 

Silurian Maryland
Silurian geology of Pennsylvania
Silurian southern paleotemperate deposits